Andabil may refer to:
 Andabil, Ardabil
 Andabil, East Azerbaijan